Gabriella Farinon (born  17 August 1941) is an Italian television and radio presenter and actress.

Life and career 
Born in Oderzo, after appearing in several films, in 1961 Farinon joined RAI as announcer. Starting from 1968, she presented several programs of various genres, notably several editions of the Sanremo Music Festival and of Un disco per l'estate. The last program she presented was the 1997 Rai 3 talk show TeleSogni.

Farinon's daughter Barbara Modesti, whom she had with documentarist Dore Modesti, is a RAI journalist. Her sister Luisa married businessman Francesco Gaetano Caltagirone.

Selected filmography 

La cento chilometri (1959)
 Blood and Roses (1960)
Space-Men (1960) 
Anonima cocottes (1960)
Le ambiziose (1960)
Sword in the Shadows (1961)
Alexander Zwo (1972, TV miniseries)
Più forte sorelle (1973)
Borsalino & Co. (1974) 
C'è una spia nel mio letto (1976)
Goodnight, Ladies and Gentlemen (1976)

References

External links 
 

1941 births
Living people
People from Oderzo
Italian film actresses
Italian television actresses
Italian television presenters
Italian radio presenters
20th-century Italian actresses
Italian women radio presenters
Italian women television presenters